Dresden Industriegelände station is a railway station in the city of Dresden, Saxony, Germany. The station lies on the Görlitz–Dresden railway.

Train services
The station is served by local and suburban services, which are operated by DB Regio Südost and Vogtlandbahn.

References

External links

Deutsche Bahn's station website

Industriegelande
Railway stations in Germany opened in 1897
DresdenIndustriegelande